David William Valencia Antonio (born 29 December 1963) is a Philippine prelate of the Catholic Church who serves as the Bishop of the Diocese of Ilagan in Isabela and the concurrent Apostolic Administrator of the Apostolic Vicariate of San Jose in Mindoro.

Biography
David William Valencia Antonio was born in Nagtupacan, Santo Domingo, Ilocos Sur, on 29 December 1963. He attended philosophy classes at San Pablo Seminary in Baguio, and theology courses at Immaculate Conception School of Theology in Vigan. He was ordained a priest on 1 December 1988, in the Archdiocese of Nueva Segovia. He earned a Doctorate of Sacred Theology from The Catholic University of America in 1999.

After some years as professor at the Immaculate Conception School of Theology, he was appointed dean of studies in 1993, and then rector of the same seminary.

In 2005, he became parish priest in Santa Lucia, Ilocos Sur, and later vicar-general of the Archdiocese of Nueva Segovia.

On 15 June 2011, Pope Benedict XVI appointed him Auxiliary Bishop of Nueva Segovia and Titular Bishop of Basti. He was consecrated bishop on 26 August 2011 by Giuseppe Pinto, then the Apostolic Nuncio to the Philippines. Co-consecrators were Ernesto Antolin Salgado, the Archbishop of Nueva Segovia, and Orlando Beltrán Quevedo, the present Cardinal-Archbishop of Cotabato.

On 21 November 2015, Pope Francis named him Apostolic Administrator of the Apostolic Vicariate of San José in Mindoro. On 14 November 2018, Pope Francis made him the Bishop of Ilagan in Isabela.

References

1963 births
Living people
Bishops appointed by Pope Benedict XVI
Catholic University of America alumni
Filipino bishops